The 2015 Idol Star Athletics Ssireum Basketball Futsal Archery Championships (Hangul: 아이돌스타 육상 씨름 농구 풋살 양궁 선수권대회) was held at Goyang Gymnasium in Goyang, South Korea on August 10 and 11, 2015 and was broadcast on MBC on September 28 and 29, 2015. At the championships, a total number of 8 events (4 in athletics and in ssireum, archery, futsal, basketball 1 each) were contested: 4 by men and 4 by women. There were around 300 K-pop singers and celebrities who participated, divided into 10 teams.

Cast

Main
Team Daitso: Super Junior, Shinee, CNBLUE, Infinite, AOA, Red Velvet, Lovelyz, N.Flying, NCT (group)'s Yuta and Jaehyun (singer)
Team Yeo-vengers: Kara, Rainbow, Dal Shabet, GFriend, Minx, EXID
Team Young because we run: ZE:A, Sistar, Nine Muses, B1A4, Yoo Seung-woo, Oh My Girl, Monsta X
Team Who's the boss: Noel (band), Wonder Girls, Jeong Jinwoon, Lee Chang-min (singer), Lee Hyun, Miss A, Baek A-yeon, BTS, BESTie, Got7
Team Yeonkidol: T-ara, Secret, Girls' Day, Sonamoo, DIA
Team The return of the king: 4Minute, Beast, Apink, Roh Ji-hoon, BtoB, CLC, Yuto Adachi
Team Real Man: Andy, Teen Top, Block B, VIXX, Myname, 100%, UP10TION
Team Master out of power: Shorry, Big Star, Speed, History, Boys Republic, Wassup, Topp Dogg, Bigflo, HALO, Park Boram, 4Ten, Madtown
Team World: Nichkhun, Fei, Kangnam, Sam Carter, Jackson Wang, Mark, 1kyne, Li Wenhan, Zhou Yixuan, Rena, Shannon (South Korean singer), Sorn, Vernon
Team A day old puppy: Sleepy, So Yoo-mi, Ji He-ra, NC.A, Beatwin, Year 7 Class 1, Lip Service, Melody Day, Mamamoo, The Legend (band), La Boum, WANNA.B, Rubber Soul, Seventeen

Results

Men 

Athletics

Futsal

Basketball

Women 

Athletics

Ssireum

Archery

Ratings

References

External links
 2015 Idol Star Athletics Ssireum Basketball Futsal Archery Championships

MBC TV original programming
South Korean variety television shows
South Korean game shows
2015 in South Korean television
Idol Star Athletics Championships